The Australia men's national lacrosse team, nicknamed the Sharks, is governed by the Australian Lacrosse Association. The Sharks most recently competed in the 2018 World Lacrosse Championship, held in Netanya, Israel, where they finished fourth (behind the United States, Canada, and the Iroquois). In previous World Lacrosse Championships, the Australian men's team has earned three Silver medals and seven Bronze. 

The Australian Under 19 men's national lacrosse team, nicknamed the Crocodiles, most recently finished fourth in the 2016 U19 Men's World Championships in Coquitlam, B.C., Canada.

See also
 Lacrosse in Australia
 Australia women's national lacrosse team
 Australia national indoor lacrosse team

References

External links
 Australian Men's Lacrosse Team 2018

Men